Tetrahymanol synthase (squalene tetrahymanol cyclase) is an enzyme with systematic name squalene hydro-lyase (tetrahymanol forming). This enzyme catalyses the following chemical reaction

 tetrahymanol  squalene + H2O

The reaction occurs in the reverse direction.

This enzyme is isolated from Tetrahymena protozoans.

References

External links 
 

EC 4.2.1